Trinity Ville is a settlement in Jamaica. It has a population of 2,894 as of 2009.

References

Populated places in Saint Thomas Parish, Jamaica